Duhre (Punjabi: ਦੂਹੜੇ) is a village in Jalandhar district of Punjab State, India. The village is administrated by a sarpanch who is an elected representative of village as per Panchayati raj (India).

The name Duhre means the "land of Duhra" or where the "Duhra's live", it comes from the family name of Duhra (ਦੂਹੜਾ). Which in turn is taken from the name of Baba Duhaar, and most (Jatt Sikhs) in the village are decedents of him. Though there are some families from the Jat caste who are not part of this family in the village. The village is well known for Soccer since the 1950s.

See Our Village Video: This Video Credit Goes To Rohin Karda.

Part 1:>(*Round To All Village Video)

Part 2:>(*Near School Main Road Video)

The village is well established, as it has many well known buildings and structures:

ਸਰਕਾਰੀ ਐਲੀਮੰਟਰੀ ਸਮਾਰਟ ਸਕੂਲ (Public Elementary Smart School) grades 1-5

ਸ.ਸੈ.ਸਕੂਲ ਦੋਲੀਕੇ ਦੂਹੜੇ (GSSS. School Dolike Duhre) Built in 1952, turned into public school in 1986; grades 6-12

ਗੁਰੂਦਵਾਰਾ ਸਿੰਘ ਸਭਾ (Gurudwara Singh Sabha)

ਗੂਰੁਦਵਾਰਾ ਬਾਬਾ ਪ੍ਰਧਾਨ ਸਿੰਘ ਜੀ (Gurudawara Baba Pardhan Singh Ji)

ਸ੍ਰੀ ਗੁਰੂ ਰਵਿਦਾਸ ਗੁਰੂ ਦੁਆਰਾ ਜੀ (Shiri Guru Ravidas Gurudwara Ji Duhra)

ਸ੍ਰੀ ਗੁਰੂ ਰਵਿਦਾਸ ਨਗਰ ਕੀਰਤਨ 2022 (Shiri Guru Ravidas Ji Nagarkiratan)

ਸ੍ਰੀ ਗੁਰੂ ਰਵਿਦਾਸ ਗੁਰੂ ਦੁਆਰਾ ਜੀ (Shiri Guru Ravidas Gurudwara Sahib InDoor Video)

History 
The village of Duhre was founded by the warrior/athlete Duhaar, in the mid to late 18th century. During the 18th century, the Mughal Empire had begun to weaken and crumble, with it gave rise to the 12 Sikh Misl's. The Mughal emperor at the time, Zakariya Khan Bahadur, to make peace with the Sikhs, had given the title of Nawab to Kapur Singh, who was the Jathedar (Sikh leader) of the Dal Khalsa. Later on, Nawab Kapur Singh's Singpuria Misl (Faizullahpuria Misl), under his nephew Kushal Singh, would control many territories, while having Jalandhar (taken in 1766) and its surrounding lands as its capital. Duhaar migrated from the Majha (Barri Doab, heartland) region of Punjab, from Gurdaspur area, and settled near Alawalpur (Bist Doab). Not much is known about his earlier life or his family background beside that he was a Sikh Jat. We don't know why he migrated, it could have been because of war and/or in search of work.

As a reputable athlete, Duhaar was later invited like many others to a competition of kabaddi by the Nawab of Jalandhar, Kushal Singh at Alawalpur (a territory in Jalandhar city district). The Nawab boosted about his son (the prince Budh Singh) and challenged anyone to defeat him in Kabaddi, and if they did he would grant them a prize. Duhaar took this challenge, he bested the prince and won the competition, so impressed was the Nawab that he granted Duhaar 500 acers of land and a noble title. With this he was now known as Baba Duhaar a zamindar (noble), and with 500 acers of land he founded the village of Duhre, north east of Alawalpur. Later on he would give his brother Dollu some land as well, who would use it to create the village of Dolike; less than kilometer away from Duhre. The twin villages would later be known as Dolike-Duhre.

The family tree of Baba Duhaar
Offspring of Baba Duhaar are divided into different families and these families are known by different names as given below (ਟਬਰਾਂ ਦੈ ਨਾਂ):

ਭਾਈਕੈ। ਖੁਂਡੈ। ਕਾਲੈ। ਲੰਬੜ। ਅਮਲੀ। ਲਾਬਾਣੈ। ਪਕਿਆਂਵਾਲੈ। ਮਾੜੈ। ਝੱਟੇ। ਏਕੜ। ਕੂਕੈ। ਨੌਕਰ। ਮਾਨਾਊ। ਬੁੱਚੈ। ਮੌਲੈ।

ਸਾਰੀਏ। ਖੱਬੜ (These two families are Sikh Jat but not part of the Duhra family)

Pahika, Kundhah, Kala, Lanbrr, Amli, Lubanah, Pakianhwale, Marrah, Chta, Acker, Kuukah, Nauker, Manaou, Bucah, Maulah.

Saria and Khber: are not part of the Duhra Family, they settled from outside the village during the Partition of India.

Though the nobility (zamindar) statues would not survive into present day, as the wealth and land was divide by his sons; who were later divide into 15 families. Also many of the members of this family would later migrate from Punjab, India, in search for work, and settle in: United Kingdom, Australia, USA, Europe, and Middle East.

Geography 
"The Duhra village is situated on Adampur to Kala Bhakra road at 31.46 Degrees North and 75.67 Degrees East. It has an average elevation of 232 meters. It is located 24 Kilometers towards North from the district headquarters of Jalandhar, 166 kilometers from State Capital Chandigarh and 6 kilometers from the Adampur Police Station. The total geographical area of the village is 196 hectares (500 acres). Villages surrounding Duhra village are Mali Nangal, Nangal, Sarala, Badala, Dherowal, Jaganpur, Dholike, Jaflane. The nearest big towns are Adampur, Alawalpur, Bhogpur, and Sham Chorasi and cities: Jalandhar, Amritsar, Pathankot, Hoshiarpur, and Ludhiana."

Demography 
"As of the 2011 Indian census, the Duhra village had a total population of 1406 (703 males, 703 females) and 315 houses. All the Jat Sikhs are descendants of Baba Duhaar. Different communities and technicians like: blacksmiths, carpenters, weavers, tailor-masters, ceramists, cobblers, music- bands, and goldsmiths lived in the village, so in this way, the village is considered self-sufficient and self-dependent. The major profession of the people is farming and other professions are related to it. Some Muslim families also live there, as they did not go to Pakistan in 1947 because they preferred to live in this village. With the passage of time, people have changed their professions as per their needs, and at present, there are no goldsmiths, cobblers and weavers. For their livelihood and a better life, people are migrating to cities and other countries. But even so, the village is doing well and has all the modern facilities like electricity, phone service, sewerage, television, bus service, and paved roads."

Notable people
Note:

Chanchal Singh:BA, Teacher, Football star, went to England (06Oct32-01Jun21)

Amar Singh, Major British Indian Army, Military Cross. 1st Bn. 12th. Frontier Force Regiment. Killed in action in Italy on 12 May 1944. 

Jagat Singh:   Matric, Police Inspector

Bakshish Singh:   F.A, D.S.P.

Rashem Singh:   F.A, D.S.P.

Gurnam Singh:   B.A. Went to England

Gurdial Singh. :   B.A. Went to England

Gurdeep Singh:   Matric Went to England

Bakshish Singh:   B.E, S.D.O.

Charn Singh:   MSc, Physics, Associate Professor Physics, Government College Kapurthala.

Nirmal Singh:  B.A. (Doaba College), Mining Engineering (UK), LLB (Ranchi University). Panjab University Gatka champion 1948. General Manager Coal India.

Darshan Singh:  Matric, Subadar, Army, Business Passports

Harbhajan Singh:   Matric, Kanogo, Revenue Department.

Surjan Singh:   B.A.B.T, Headmaster, Government High School Bhogpur.

Sucha Singh:  Matric, Holdar, Army.

Harbhajan Singh:   Matric, Holdar, Army.

Kawal Singh:   Matric, Holdar, Army.

Harbhajan Singh:   Matric, Subadar, army.

Bikar Singh:   Matric, Holdar, Army.

Bakshish Singh:   Matric, Subadar, Army.

Lashkar Singh:   Matric, Subadar, Army.

Dolat Ram:  Matric, Service.Station Master, Railway

Surjan Singh :  Matric, Business

Dolat Singh :  Matric, Business.

Tirath Ram:  Matric, Business

Sukhchain Singh:   Matric, J.B.T.  Teacher.

Ajit Singh:   Matric, J.B.T. Teacher.

Nirmal Singh:   Matric, J.B.T. Teacher

Mohan Singh:   F.A. Office job at Hoshiarpur.

Piara Singh:   Matric, J.B.T. Teacher.

Nirmal Singh:   Matric, J.B.T. Teacher.

Kirpa Singh:   Matric, J.B.T. Teacher

Ajit Singh:   Matric, J.B.T. Teacher.

Amrik Singh:   Matric, J.B.T. Teacher.

Biker Singh:   B.A. Service

Dhian Singh:   B.A. Service

Parkash Singh:   Matric, Service in industry.

Bakshish Singh:   B.A. Went to England.

Sarwan Singh:   Matric, Went to England.

Sawarn Singh: Matric, Veterinary Course, Veterinary Doctor.

Rashem Singh:   B.A. Went to England.

Malkit Singh:   Matric, Officer in Navy.

Ajit Singh:   Matric, Officer in Navy.

Darshan Singh:  Matric, Service

Kishan Singh:   Matric, joined in religious dera.

Amrik Singh:   Matric, a very good singer, went to Canada.

Gian Singh:   B.A. Service Markfed.

Dhani Ram: Matric, Shopkeeper.

Seva Singh:   Matric, Farming

Khushdev Singh:   Matric, Went to England.

Terlochan Singh:   M.A. Supports Officer and Coach of Foot Ball. In Guru Nanak Dev University.

Dr.Malkiat Singh :   PhD Biology, Professor and Senior Entomologist, Punjab Agricultural University Ludhiana.

Ramlubaeha:   B.A. I.A.S. Deputy Commissioner Ganga Nagar, settled at Ganga Nagar.

Surjit Singh:   B.A.  I.R.S. Assistant Commissioner Sale Tax, Jalandhar.

Dr. Hari Ram:   M.B.B.S. Doctor in Medical Department.

Gurnam Singh:   B.E. Engineer Senior Manager Work in Aeronautics at Kahanpur.

Surinder Singh:  B.E. Engineer.

Jaswant Singh:  B.E. Civil Engineer, settled at Jalalabad.

Pakahar Singh:   B.A. Service

Seva Singh:   B.A.  Service, Punjab Agricultural University Ludhiana, went to Canada.

Gurdev Singh: PhD Punjabi went to Canada.i

Karampal Singh:   I.R.S. Assistant Commissioner Income Tax.

Surinder Singh:  B.A. Surveyor in Civil Department, settled at Shama Nangal

Buhla Singh:  Matric, Officer in Navvy. Settled in Bombay

Harjinder Singh (Guggu): Jalandhar District champion (Track)

Mohinder Singh:  Matric, Orthopaedic course, Settled in Agra.

Gian Singh:   Matric, Business, Transport.

Karnail Singh:  Matric, Farming.

Gurmeet Singh:   Martic, Business, Transport.

Amarjit Singh:   Graduation in Surrey, Real-Estate Business in Canada.

Pritam Singh:   Matric, service.

Manohar Singh:   Matric, J.E. Electrical Department.

Tirath Singh:   Matric, J.E. Electrical Department.

Karnail Singh:   Matric, farmer.

Harbhajan Singh:   Matric, Went to England.

Ajit Singh:   Matric, Subadar, Army

Ajab Singh:   Matric, Went to Canada.

Rashem Singh:   Matric, Went to Canada.

Terlochan Singh:   M.A. Went toCanada.

Baldev Singh:   B.A. Went to Canada.

Dial Singh:   Matric, went to Canada.

Semi Ram:  Matric, went to Canada.

Avtar Singh:   F.A. Farming in Rajasthan.

Bagecha Singh:   Matric, Service in Court Jalandhar

Tersem Singh:   Matric, Subadar, Army, later went to Canada

Harbhjan Singh:   Matric, Service in Khadi Bhandar Adumpur

Herpal Singh:   Matric, farming.

Avtar Singh :  Matric, Subadar, Army.

Amrik Singh:   Matric, Subadar, Army.

Ajit Singh:   Matric, Subadar, Army.

Sukhdev Singh:   Matric, Subdar, Army.

Rishpal Singh:   Matric, Subdar, Army.

Tersam Singh :   Matric, Subadar, Army.

Lahmbar Singh :   Matric, Subadar, Army.

Harjit Singh:    Matric, went to Canada.

Ladi Duhra : B. A. Tehseldar

Avtar Singh:  BSc, Teacher, went to Canada.

Pargat Singh: Businessman went to the UK

References 
2. https://www.drduhra.com/post/duhra-village-in-punjab

3. List of villages in Jalandhar district at Census of India, 2011

4. https://www.drduhra.com/post/duhra-village-in-punjab

5. https://schools.org.in/jalandhar/03040401902/gsss-dolike-dhure.html

6. https://www.facebook.com/Dolike-Duhre-High-School-111627065587689/

7. https://www.drduhra.com/post/duhra-village-in-punjab

8. https://punjab.gov.in/

https://www.drduhra.com/about

Kakshi, S. R.; Rashmi Pathak (2007). Punjab Through the Ages. Sarup & Sons. p. 134. .

Chhabra, G. S. (1960). The advanced study in history of the Punjab, Volume 1. Sharanjit. p. 494. OCLC 9369401.

Latif, Muhammad (1964). History of the Panjáb from the remotest antiquity to the present time. Eurasia Publishing House. p. 323. OCLC 936342.

Jalandhar
Nawab Kapur Singh
Khushal Singh
Singhpuria Misl
Misl

External links
List of villages in Jalandhar district at Census of India, 2011
https://www.drduhra.com/post/duhra-village-in-punjab
https://schools.org.in/jalandhar/03040401902/gsss-dolike-dhure.html
https://www.facebook.com/Dolike-Duhre-High-School-111627065587689/
https://www.drduhra.com/post/duhra-village-in-punjab
https://punjab.gov.in/
https://www.facebook.com/Duhre-sports-club-642859702525443/
https://www.sikhcoalition.org/about-sikhs/history/
https://www.sikhnet.com/pages/sikh-history

Villages in Jalandhar district